Mihang'o is a neighbourhood in the city of Nairobi.

Location
It is lies along the Nairobi Eastern Bypass Highway, and borders, Utawala, Njiru and Ruai.

Overview
Mihang'o is generally a residential neighbourhood in Nairobi with some mixed-use features. It has a mixture of mid-rises and single-family homes and is home to low-income to middle-income earners.

As of 2019, Mihang'o has a population of 60,367, with 28,428 of them being male and 31,937 being female. The neighbourhood has a population density of 5478/km2 in a land area of 11km2.

Mihango Ward, an electoral division within Embakasi East Constituency. It borrows its name from the estate and covers the neighbourhood area.

References

Populated places in Kenya
Suburbs of Nairobi